Nuttin' but Love is the fifth and final studio album by rap group Heavy D & the Boyz.

Reception

The album was released on May 24, 1994, by Uptown Records and was produced by DJ Eddie F, Teddy Riley, Marley Marl, Erick Sermon, Kid Capri, Easy Mo Bee, The Trackmasters, and Pete Rock.  The first track on the album, "Friends & Respect", featured spoken intros by the likes of LL Cool J, Buju Banton, KRS-One, Kool G Rap, Little Shawn, MC Lyte, Martin Lawrence, Pete Rock, Positive K, Q-Tip, Queen Latifah, Spike Lee and Treach.

Charts and singles
Nuttin' but Love proved to be the group's most successful release, reaching #11 on the Billboard 200, #1 on Billboard's Top R&B/Hip-Hop Albums chart (for one week), and was certified 2× Platinum. Four singles from the album made it on at least one Billboard singles chart: "Nuttin' but Love (Heavy D)" (which samples “Ecstasy” from the Scottish act Endgames), "Got Me Waiting (Heavy D)" (the highest-charting single from the album, peaking at #20 on the Billboard Hot 100), "Black Coffee (Heavy D)" and "Sex wit You". The video for "Nuttin' but Love (Heavy D)" also featured actress Rebecca Gayheart, who was then just known as "The Noxzema Girl" for her commercials for the skin care product. It also featured then top model Cynthia Bailey, who is now on The Real Housewives of Atlanta. The video also featured an appearance by comedian Chris Tucker.

Track listing
 "Friends & Respect" (Dwight Meyers, Jean-Claude Olivier)- 5:12
 "Sex Wit You" (Dwight Meyers, Peter Phillips) - 4:04
 "Got Me Waiting (featuring Crystal Johnson)" (Dwight Meyers, Peter Phillips) - 4:31
 "Nuttin' but Love" (Dwight Meyers, David Love) - 3:34
 "Something Goin' On" (Dwight Meyers, Marlon Williams) - 3:28
 "This Is Your Night" (Dwight Meyers, Teddy Riley) - 3:31
 "Got Me Waiting (Remix)" (featuring Silk) (Dwight Meyers, Peter Phillips) - 6:11
 "Take Your Time" - (Dwight Meyers, Erick Sermon) 4:07
 "Spend a Little Time on Top" (Dwight Meyers, Marlon Williams) - 3:23
 "Keep It Goin'" (Dwight Meyers, Troy Williams) - 3:59
 "Black Coffee" (Dwight Meyers, Osten Harvey, Peter Phillips) - 4:28
 "Move On" (Dwight Meyers, Jean-Claude Olivier) - 4:28
 "The Lord's Prayer" (Dwight Meyers) - :54

Charts

Certifications

See also
 List of number-one R&B albums of 1994 (U.S.)

References

External links
 Heavy D & the Boyz-Nuttin' but Love at Discogs

1994 albums
Albums produced by Easy Mo Bee
Albums produced by Erick Sermon
Albums produced by Marley Marl
Albums produced by Pete Rock
Albums produced by Teddy Riley
Albums produced by Trackmasters
Heavy D albums
MCA Records albums
Uptown Records albums